Francisca Chipare (born 1 October 1998) is a Zimbabwean cricketer who plays for the Zimbabwe women's national cricket team. In February 2021, Chipare was named in Zimbabwe's Women's Twenty20 International (WT20I) squad for their series against Pakistan. However, due to the COVID-19 pandemic, the tour was called off after just one match, with Chipare missing out on her chance to debut.

In October 2021, she was named in Zimbabwe's Women's One Day International (WODI) squad for their series against Ireland. The following month, she was again named in Zimbabwe's WODI squad, this time for their series against Bangladesh. She made her WODI debut on 10 November 2021, for Zimbabwe against Bangladesh. Later the same month, she was named in Zimbabwe's team for the 2021 Women's Cricket World Cup Qualifier tournament in Zimbabwe.

In April 2022, she was named in Zimbabwe's WT20I squad for the 2022 Capricorn Women's Tri-Series. She made her WT20I debut on 21 April 2022, for Zimbabwe against Uganda.

She started playing cricket at the age of eleven. She was coached by Nonhlahla Nyathi. She is currently pursuing Bachelor of Science in wildlife, ecology and conservation.

References

External links

1998 births
Living people
Zimbabwean women cricketers
Zimbabwe women One Day International cricketers
Zimbabwe women Twenty20 International cricketers
Place of birth missing (living people)
Mountaineers women cricketers